Balasangam is an Indian children's organization wing of the Communist Party of India (Marxist) (CPIM). It has about a million members in about 20,000 units across Kerala. Balasangham is the largest children's groups in Kerala, and its kalajatha Venalthumbikal is the biggest children's theater in Asia. The first Balasangham started its operations on 28 December 1938, at Kalliasseri of Chiraykkal panchayath in Kannur. E.K. Nayanar was the first president of Balasangham.
First state conference was held at Kottayam and second at Pilicode, Kasaragod.
The third state conference was held in October 2014 in Palakkad.
The fourth state conference was held in December 2016 in Perinthalmanna in Malappuram. Fifth state conference was held at Adoor, Pathanamthitta.Sixth State Conference was held in October 2022 in Thrissur. 

Currently, its office bearers are: 
President: B ANUJA
Secretary: N ADHIL
Convenor: TK Narayanadas 
Co-ordinator: Adv. M. Randheesh
www.balasangham.com

Notable Figures 

 M Vijin, the former state secretary of Balasangam is the MLA from Kalliasseri Assembly Constituency.
 VP Sanu, the former Balasangam leader is the All India President of Students' Federation of India. 
Arya Rajendran President of Balasangam is the Mayor of Trivandrum Corporation.

Activities
 Venal Thumbi Kalajadha (Children's Theater)

References

Organisations based in Kerala
Pioneer movement
Youth wings of communist parties of India
1938 establishments in India
Organizations established in 1938